The Capablanca Memorial is a chess tournament that has been held annually in Cuba since 1962 in honor of José Raúl Capablanca y Graupera. At the time, it was the best paid tournament in the world.  Since 1974 B and C tournaments have been held.

1962 tournament
The first José Raúl Capablanca Memorial was held from 29 April to 30 May 1962 in the Habana Libre hotel in Havana, Cuba. Miguel Najdorf was first in a field of 22 players, followed by Lev Polugaevsky and Boris Spassky, Svetozar Gligorić and Vasily Smyslov, Borislav Ivkov, etc.

1965 tournament
The fourth tournament held in 1965 was marked by an unusual circumstance. U.S. Champion Bobby Fischer had been invited to play and was offered a $3000 appearance fee, but the United States Department of State would not allow him to travel to Cuba due to tensions in Cuba–United States relations. American Grandmaster Larry Evans had been permitted to play in the tournament the year before, as he was also acting as a journalist. The U.S. Department of State often allowed newsmen and journalists to travel to off-limits countries, but it would not budge on Fischer even though he had made arrangements to write about the event for the Saturday Review. Fischer instead played his games by telex from the Marshall Chess Club in New York City. Capablanca's son Dr. José Raúl Capablanca Jr relayed the moves in Havana. When Fischer's participation seemed assured, Cuban President Fidel Castro called it a "great propaganda victory for Cuba", making headlines. When Fischer heard of this, he cabled Castro threatening to withdraw unless Castro stopped making political statements about Fischer's participation. A cabled reply from Castro eased Fischer's concern and he joined the field of twenty-two players, with thirteen Grandmasters and seven International Masters. Play by teletype added to the strain of the tournament. Although the English magazine CHESS thought that this was an advantage for Fischer who became accustomed to this manner of play (each of his opponents experienced it only once), others considered it a handicap for Fischer who endured the extra labor in every game.  Former World Champion Vasily Smyslov (USSR) won the tournament with 15½ points of 21. Borislav Ivkov (Yugoslavia), Efim Geller (USSR), and Fischer shared second through fourth, a half point behind.  Although Fischer did not win, his performance was widely considered a success given the playing conditions and the fact that Fischer was playing his first international tournament in three years.

Winners
{| class="sortable wikitable"
! # !! Year !! City !! Winner
|-
|align="center"|1||1962||Havana||
|-
|align="center"|2||1963||Havana||
|-
|align="center"|3||1964||Havana||
|-
|align="center"|4||1965||Havana||
|-
|align="center"|5||1967||Havana||
|-
|align="center"|6||1968||Havana||
|-
|align="center"|7||1969||Havana||
|-
|align="center"|8||1971||Havana||
|-
|align="center"|9||1972||Cienfuegos||
|-
|10||1973||Cienfuegos||
|-
|11||1974||Camagüey||
|-
|12||1975||Cienfuegos||
|-
|13||1976||Cienfuegos||
|-
|14||1977||Cienfuegos||
|-
|15||1979||Cienfuegos||
|-
|16||1980||Cienfuegos||
|-
|17||1981||Cienfuegos||
|-
|18||1983||Cienfuegos||
|-
|19||1984||Cienfuegos||
|-
|20||1985||Havana||
|-
|21||1986||Havana||
|-
|22||1987||Camagüey||
|-
|23||1988||Havana||
|-
|24||1989||Holguín||
|-
|25||1990||Havana||
|-
|26||1991||Havana||
|-
|27||1992||Matanzas||
|-
|28||1993||Matanzas||
|-
|29||1994||Matanzas||
|-
|30||1995||Matanzas||
|-
|31||1996||Cienfuegos||
|-
|32||1997||Cienfuegos||
|-
|33||1998||Havana||
|-
|34||1999||Havana||
|-
|35||2000||Varadero||
|-
|36||2001||Havana||
|-
|37||2002||Havana||
|-
|38||2003||Havana||
|-
|39||2004||Havana||
|-
|40||2005||Havana||
|-
|41||2006||Havana||
|-
|42||2007||Havana||
|-
|43||2008||Havana||
|-
|44||2009||Havana||
|-
|45||2010||Havana||
|-
|46||2011||Havana||

|-
|47||2012||Havana||
|-
|48||2013||Havana||
|-
|49||2014||Havana||
|-
|50||2015||Havana||
|-
|51||2016||Varadero||
|-
|52||2017||Varadero||
|-
|53||2018||Havana||
|-
|54||2019||Havana||
|-
|55||2022||Havana||
|}

51st Capablanca Memorial (9–19 June 2016)

The 51st edition of the Capablanca Memorial took place in the Hotel Barceló Solymar Arenas Blancas, Varadero, Cuba, from June 9 to 19, 2016. The tournament format was a six-player ten-round double round robin. The time control was 90 minutes for 40 moves plus 30 additional minutes starting from move 41, plus a 30-second increment starting from the first move.

{| class="wikitable" style="text-align:center;"
|+Cat. XVIII (2695)
! !! Player !! Rating !! 1 !! 2 !! 3 !! 4 !! 5 !! 6 !! Points !! TPR
|-
| 1 || align="left" |  || 2710
| * * || ½ ½ || ½ ½ || 1 ½ || 1 ½ || 1 1 || 7 || 2845
|-
| 2 || align="left" |  || 2682
| ½ ½ || * * || ½ ½ || ½ 1 || ½ ½ || ½ 1 || 6 || 2772
|-
| 3 || align="left" |  || 2687
| ½ ½ || ½ ½ || * * || ½ ½ || ½ ½ || ½ ½ || 5 || 2700
|-
| 4 || align="left" |  || 2688
| 0 ½ || ½ 0 || ½ ½ || * * || ½ ½ || 1 1 || 5 || 2699
|-
| 5 || align="left" |  || 2723
| 0 ½ || ½ ½ || ½ ½ || ½ ½ || * * || ½ ½ || 4½ || 2657
|-
| 6 || align="left" |  || 2681
| 0 0 || ½ 0 || ½ ½ || 0 0 || ½ ½ || * * || 2½ || 2509
|}

References

External links 
 Szachowa Vistula | Memorials Jose Raul Capablanca

Chess competitions
Sport in Havana
Chess in Cuba
1962 in chess
Recurring events established in 1962
Chess memorial tournaments
1962 establishments in Cuba